Blabia truncata is a species of beetle in the family Cerambycidae. It was described by Breuning in 1940. It is known from Colombia and Ecuador.

References

Blabia
Beetles described in 1940